Revelation is the fourth studio album by American boy band 98 Degrees, released on September 26, 2000. The album features the hit single "Give Me Just One Night (Una Noche)" which became their highest charting single as a lead artist, peaking at two on the Billboard Hot 100, staying there for two consecutive weeks. The album debuted at number-two on the Billboard 200 selling 276,343 copies in its first week, making Revelation the band's best charting album and highest first-week sales on the Billboard 200.

According to Nielsen Soundscan, the album sold over 2.5 million copies in the United States alone. At that time, "Give Me Just One Night (Una Noche)" became the most added Top 40 single in history with 170 adds on radio in its initial week, allowing the song to debut strongly at number-two in the Billboard Hot 100, becoming the highest-charting single in its debut week by a boy band, a feat that has yet to be surpassed by any other boy band to date.

Track listing

Charts

Weekly charts

Year-end charts

Sales and certifications

References

External links
 

2000 albums
98 Degrees albums
Albums produced by Richard Marx

Universal Records albums